Daria is an animated sitcom that aired on MTV from 1997 to 2002.

Main
Daria Morgendorffer (first appearance: Season 1, Episode 1, "Esteemsters"). An unfashionably dressed, bespectacled, highly intellectual, entirely pessimistic about life altogether, cynical, and sarcastic teenage girl who is portrayed as an icon of sanity in an insane household in an equally insane upper-middle-class suburb. Voiced by Tracy Grandstaff.
Jane Lane (first appearance: Season 1, Episode 1, "Esteemsters").  Daria's artistic best friend and fellow outcast, as well as the youngest of the five Lane siblings.
Quinn Morgendorffer (first appearance: Season 1, Episode 1, "Esteemsters"). Daria's shallow, materialistic and vain younger sister who is one of the most popular girls in school. She is a member of Lawndale High School's Fashion Club.
Helen Morgendorffer (first appearance: Season 1, Episode 1, "Esteemsters").  Daria and Quinn's mother, a workaholic corporate attorney and the family's principal wage earner. Voiced by Wendy Hoopes.
Jake Morgendorffer (first appearance: Season 1, Episode 1, "Esteemsters").  Daria and Quinn's father, a neurotic, short-tempered, long-suffering, but well-meaning and loving family man. Voiced by Julián Rebolledo.
Trent Lane (first appearance: Season 1, Episode 2, "The Invitation") – Jane's older brother by five years, the second-youngest Lane sibling, and the only other Lane still permanently residing in the Lane household. He plays lead guitar in his band, Mystik Spyral. Daria's unspoken crush on Trent throughout the first three seasons is one of her few weaknesses. Voiced by Alvaro J. Gonzalez.
Tom Sloane (first appearance: Season 3, Episode 13, "Jane's Addition")  – A young man who serves as love interest to Jane and later to Daria. His parents are wealthy and he attends a nearby private school. He is, in Daria's words "a little spoiled, a hair smug and a trifle egotistical" but also a "smart, funny guy who's very caring and sensitive." Voiced by Russell Hankin.

Lawndale High

Jocks and Cheerleaders
Brittany Taylor (first appearance: Episode #1.01, "Esteemsters") – Lawndale High's ditzy and bubbly head cheerleader; girlfriend to Kevin. Brittany was voiced by Lisa Kathleen Collins, under the pseudonym Janie Mertz. (In the series) and Arden Myrin (in the upcoming Jodie film)
Kevin Thompson (first appearance: Episode #1.01, "Esteemsters") – The Lawndale High football team's quarterback and equally ditzy boyfriend to Brittany. Kevin was voiced by Marc Thompson.
Michael "Mack" Jordan MacKenzie (first appearance: Episode #1.02, "The Invitation") – Jodie's boyfriend and the Lawndale High football team's captain, as well as the only intelligent person on the team. Mack was voiced by Delon Ferdinand (early season 1), Paul Williams (remainder of season 1 and season 2), Kevin Daniels (season 3), Amir Williams (seasons 4-5), and William Jackson Harper (in the upcoming Jodie Movie)
Joey, Jeffy, and Jamie (collectively known as "The Three Js") are three nearly interchangeable high-school students and members of the school's football team who constantly compete for Quinn's affection. Joey was voiced by Geoffrey Arend in "The Invitation" and Steven Huppert for the remainder of the series, Jeffy by Tim Novikoff, and Jamie by Marc Thompson.

Other classmates of Daria and Jane
Jodie Landon (first appearance: Episode #1.02, "The Invitation") – Lawndale High's class president and one of its few African-American students alongside her boyfriend Mack; she is one of Daria's few true friends other than Jane. Jodie was voiced by Jessica Cydnee Jackson (in the series) and Tracee Ellis Ross (In the upcoming Jodie film)
Andrea (first appearance: Episode #1.01, "Esteemsters") – The Lawndale High token goth who has a darkly nihilistic personality, moreso than Daria's. According to the season four episode, "Mart of Darkness", Andrea works at a big box store and knows of Daria's and Jane's reputation for making snarky remarks about others, which is why she actively avoids them, but is surprised when they promise to keep her job a secret. Andrea was voiced by Susie Lewis Lynn (seasons 1–3) and Lisa Kathleen Collins/Janie Mertz (seasons 4 & 5).
Charles "Upchuck" Ruttheimer, III (first appearance: Episode #1.02, "The Invitation") – An obnoxious flirt with curly red hair and freckles. Charles was voiced by Marc Thompson (season 1) and Geoffrey Arend (seasons 2-5).

The Fashion Club
The Fashion Club is a group of highly fashionable girl students in Lawndale High that Quinn is a member of but Daria is not.
Sandi Griffin (first appearance: Episode #101, "Esteemsters") – The club president and most popular girl in school. She often tries to embarrass or sabotage Quinn due to jealousy. She was voiced by Lisa Kathleen Collins/Janie Mertz.
Stacy Rowe (first appearance: Episode #101, "Esteemsters") – The secretary of the club. Stacy is very insecure & neurotic and is the closest to Quinn. She was voiced by Jessica Zaino for the first half of season 1 and Sarah Drew for the remainder of the series run.
Tiffany Blum-Deckler (first appearance: Episode #101, "Esteemsters") – The sycophant of the club. She is known for her monotonous voice and lack of intelligence. She was voiced by Ashley Albert.

Faculty
Ms. Janet Barch (first appearance: Episode #1.07 "The Lab Brat") – Science teacher. Due to her recent divorce, she hates all men, often taking out her frustration on Kevin, Mack, and (starting in season two), Mr. DeMartino. Despite her misandry, she has a soft spot for Mr. O'Neill (who let her vent her feelings about being divorced as seen on "The Daria Hunter") and later marries him during the series finale movie, Is It College Yet?. Ms. Barch is voiced by Ashley Albert.
Mrs. Diane Bennett (first appearance: Episode #105 "Malled") – Economics teacher. voiced by Amy Bennett.
Ms. Claire Defoe (first appearance: Episode #102 "The Invitation") – Art teacher. voiced by Nicole Carin in seasons one and two and Danielle Carin for the remainder of the series.
Mr. Anthony DeMartino (first appearance: Episode #101 "Esteemsters") – History teacher. He often loses his temper due to his students' poor grasp of history. One of his eyes is bigger than the other, and noticeably gets larger the angrier he is. He is a lifelong bachelor and Vietnam War veteran. Mr. DeMartino is voiced by Marc Thompson.
Ms. Angela Li (first appearance: Episode #101 "Esteemsters") – School principal. Incredibly corrupt, her school safety policies often border on those of a police state and she will do anything to increase the budget and reputation of the school. Ms. Li is voiced by Nora Laudani.
Mr. Timothy O'Neill (first appearance: Episode #101 "Esteemsters") – English teacher. He is often overly-sentimental and naïve when interacting with students. He ends up in an unlikely relationship with the much more aggressive Ms. Barch during Lawndale High's ill-fated paintball trip on "The Daria Hunter". It is hinted that Mr. O'Neill is a closeted communist. Mr. O'Neill is voiced by Marc Thompson.
Ms. Margaret Manson (first appearance: Episode #101 "Esteemsters") – School psychologist. She only has one speaking role, in Episode #101 ("Esteemsters"), in which she declares Daria has self-esteem issues. Ms. Manson is voiced by Jessica Zaino.
Ms. Morris (first appearance: Episode #211 "See Jane Run") – Physical-education teacher, track team coach, and also the cheerleading coach. She is openly corrupt, turning physical-education class into covert cheerleading practice, and fudging grades for athletes. She had taught Jane's sisters and viewed the whole family as shiftless slackers. Ms. Morris is voiced by Katie Kingston.

Other characters

The Lane Family
Vincent Lane (first appearance: Episode #3.08, "Lane Miserables") – Jane's father, a professional photographer. Like his wife Amanda, he is rarely ever home and only appears in two episodes: #308 "Lane Miserables" and #507 "Art Burn".
Amanda Lane (first appearance, non-speaking: Episode #201, "Arts N Crass") – Jane's mother, a bohemian artist. Her extended absences from the Lane household are a recurring theme, and she only appears in three episodes: #201 "Arts N Crass", #308 "Lane Miserables", and #507 "Art Burn".
Wind Lane (first appearance: Episode #3.08, "Lane Miserables") – Jane's eldest brother. He previously got divorced from his first wife, and is emotionally fragile because his second marriage is also on the rocks.
Summer Lane (first appearance: Episode #3.08, "Lane Miserables") – Jane and Trent's older sister. Summer has four children, who often try to run away from her and their household.
Penny Lane (first appearance: Episode #3.08, "Lane Miserables") – Jane and Trent's older sister. Penny lives a nomadic life, moving between Latin American countries and marginally supporting herself by selling arts and crafts.
Courtney Lane (first appearance: Episode #3.08, "Lane Miserables") – Summer's runaway daughter.
Adrian Lane (first appearance: Episode #3.08, "Lane Miserables") – Summer's runaway son.

Other insignificant members of the Lane extended family that are seen in Episode #112 ("The Teachings of Don Jake") include Aunt Bernice, Uncle Max (who is constantly drunk and likes Trent for being a loser), and a verbally abusive, unnamed grandmother in a wheelchair.

Mystik Spiral
Mystik Spiral is a band that Jane Lane's brother Trent plays in.
Jesse Moreno – Second guitarist (although some images show him playing bass), and occasionally sings backing vocals. He first appeared in episode #111 ("Road Worrier") and was immediately revealed to be a man of significantly few words. Jesse was voiced by Tom Borrillo (voice actor alias: Willy Schwenz).
Nick Campbell – Bass guitarist (although some images show him playing guitar). He is the most low-profile member of the group.
Max Tyler – Drummer. Usually only seen behind his drum kit, he is the most aggressive member of the band. Max was voiced by Wass Stevens.

Miscellaneous
Rita Barksdale (first appearance: Episode #2.04, "I Don't") – Helen's older sister. She appeared in two episodes: "I Don't" (#204) and "Aunt Nauseam" (#510).
Amy Barksdale (first appearance: Episode #204, "I Don't") – Helen's younger sister who Daria takes after. She appeared in three episodes: "I Don't" (#204), "Through a Lens Darkly" (#302), and "Aunt Nauseam" (#510).
Erin Chambers (first appearance: Episode #204, "I Don't") – Rita's daughter. She appeared in two episodes: "I Don't" (#204), and "Aunt Nauseam" (#510).
Brian Danielson (only appearance: Episode #204, "I Don't") – Erin's husband. He appeared in two episodes: "I Don't" (#204) and "Aunt Nauseam" (#510).
Coyote Yeager (only appearance: Episode #205, "That Was Then, This Is Dumb") – One of Helen and Jake's old friends and Willow's wife.
Ethan Yeager (only appearance: Episode #205, "That Was Then, This Is Dumb") – Son of Willow and Coyote.
Willow Yeager (only appearance: Episode #205, "That Was Then, This Is Dumb") – One of Helen and Jake's old friends and Coyote's husband.
Ted DeWitt-Clinton (first appearance: Episode #207, "The New Kid") – A student at Lawndale High who began attending after convincing his parents (Leslie DeWitt and Grant Clinton) to allow him to experience a non-home-schooled education. Ted was voiced by Sky Berdahl. He appeared in two other episodes: #403 ("A Tree Grows in Lawndale") and #406 ("I Loathe a Parade").
Mrs. Johanssen (first appearance: Episode #104, "Café Disaffecto") – A morbidly-obese Lawndale resident voiced by Amy Bennett. Other appearances: #205 ("That Was Then, This Is Dumb"), #302 ("The Old and the Beautiful"), #408 ("Psycho Therapy"), and #409 ("Mart of Darkness").
Monique (first appearance: Episode #2.12, "Pierce Me") – Trent's on-again off-again girlfriend with an affinity for piercings. She also appeared in Episode #308 ("Lane Miserables").
Artie (first appearance: Episode 101, "Esteemsters") – Young local pizza-parlor employee and self-proclaimed alien abductee. Other appearances: #311 ("The Lawndale File") and #403 ("A Tree Grows in Lawndale").
Dr. Shar (only appearance: Episode #109, "Too Cute") – A cosmetic surgeon.
Brooke (only appearance: Episode #109, "Too Cute") – A Lawndale High student who received a nose job from Dr. Shar which increased her popularity.
Eric Schrecter (first appearance: Episode #212, "Pierce Me") – Helen's domineering colleague. A fast-talking hustler of a businessman, Eric is only seen three times, but is referred to frequently; whenever Helen is on the phone, it is usually with Eric. Eric was voiced by Evan Farmer.
Robert (first appearance: Episode #207, "The New Kid"): A dimwitted, stiff, exceedingly-polite boy used repeatedly as a sort of "decoy date". Robert was voiced by Evan Farmer.
Tommy Sherman (only appearance: Episode #113, "The Misery Chick") – An ex-student of Lawndale High and their football team's former star quarterback. Tommy Sherman was voiced by Ken Schatz.
Tad and Tricia Gupty (first appearance: Episode #108, "Pinch Sitter") – The two Gupty children are portrayed as mindless puppets and Jane and Daria manage to teach them to think for themselves during a babysitting gig. Lester and Lauren Gupty made their first appearance in Episode #105: "Malled". Tricia Gupty was voiced by actress Sarah Drew and Tad Gupty is voiced by Miles Purinton in "I Loathe a Parade".
David Sorenson (only appearance: Is It Fall Yet?) – Quinn's summer tutor and first and only truly romantic interest shown. David was voiced by American talk-show host Carson Daly.
Daniel Dotson (only appearance: Is It Fall Yet?) – Jane's art camp teacher. Daniel was voiced by rock musician Dave Grohl.
Alison (only appearance: Is It Fall Yet?) – Jane's temporary friend. Alison's appearance was modeled on, and voiced by, indie rock singer Bif Naked.
Heather (only appearance: Episode #103) -- When Daria and her family visit Jake's college, Heather serves as their tour guide.
Lindy (only appearance: Is It College Yet?) – Quinn's temporary colleague and consequential friend. Lindy was voiced by Jessica Hardin.
Link (only appearance: Is It Fall Yet?) – An unwilling participant in the self-examination camp.
Nathan (only appearance: episode #509)-A local teenage boy with an affection for dressing in 1940s-style clothing.
Val (only appearance: Episode #305: "The Lost Girls") An over-the-top, name-dropping fashionista, editor of Val Magazine, who visits Lawndale High after Daria wins an essay contest. Val is voiced by Stacy Brass.
Chris and Sam Griffin (first appearance: Episode #208, "Gifted") – Sandi's younger brothers.

Holidays
Cupid (only appearance: "Depth Takes a Holiday") – The spirit of Valentine's Day, taking the appearance of a large man with wings wearing a toga. He has the ability to inspire affection in anyone.
St. Patrick's Day (only appearance: "Depth Takes a Holiday") – St. Patrick's Day is a man dressed all in green who speaks with an Irish accent.
Christmas (only appearance: "Depth Takes a Holiday") – A native of Holiday Island, and one of the most popular students at Holiday Island High School.
Halloween (only appearance: "Depth Takes a Holiday") – The spirit of Halloween, who leaves her home with Christmas and Guy Fawkes Day to form a band. Her voice artist was Danielle Carin.
Guy Fawkes Day (only appearance: "Depth Takes a Holiday") – The spirit of Guy Fawkes Day, who wears black leather and spouts off stereotypical British phrases.

References

External links
Outpost Daria – Notable Guest Stars

Characters
Daria
Daria